Haʻapai is a group of islands, islets, reefs, and shoals in the central part of Tonga. The Tongatapu island group lies to its south, and the Vavaʻu group lies to its north. Seventeen of the Haʻapai islands are inhabited. Their combined population is 5,419.

The administrative capital village of Haʻapai District is Pangai, which is located on Lifuka.

Geography

Haʻapai comprises 51 islands that lie directly west of the Tonga Trench. Farther to the east are the coral islands, which are inhabited. Seventeen of the islands are inhabited, including the main islands of Lifuka and Foa. The two main villages in the archipelago are Pangai on Lifuka (where Salote Pilolevu Airport is located) and Ha'ano. A total of 6125 people live on the Ha'apai islands (Census 2016).

All of the larger islands of Haʻapai are in the eastern Lifuka group. The two largest islands are Lifuka and Foa which in 2016 had recorded populations of 2,205 and 1,392 people respectively. The next largest are Nomuka and Haʻano, which have four villages, with a combined population of 910. To the south of these islands is ʻUiha, which has two villages with a combined population of 695. ʻUiha is also the site of ancient burial grounds and an ancient monument.

The large islands of Tofua (an active volcano) and Kao (a dormant volcano) are in the far west. The islands of the Kotu group, locally known as Lulunga, are in the southwest of the archipelago. The islands of the Nomuka group, locally known as ʻOtu Muʻomuʻa, are farther south. The Hunga Tonga–Hunga Ha'apai volcano is located in the southwest of Haʻapai.

Humpback whales migrate to the area during their “wintering” seasons.

History

Traces of ancient settlements of the Lapita culture, dating from around 1500 BC, have been found at sites within the Haʻapai island group.

The first European to visit Haʻapai was Abel Tasman, in 1643. Captain James Cook made several stops on some of the islands in the group in 1774 and 1777. He gave them the name of the Friendly Islands in 1777.

On 18 May 1777, when Cook arrived on one of the islands, accompanied by Omai, they were greeted by Fatafehi Paulaho, the Tu'i Tonga (meaning 'King of the Isles'), who was the most venerated of any chief on the islands.

On 28 April 1789, the Haʻapai island group was one of the sites involved in the famous Mutiny on the Bounty: Captain William Bligh visited the volcanic island of Tofua shortly after his crew set him adrift following their mutiny.

In 1806, William Mariner arrived on one of the islands, aboard the Port-au-Prince. The crew of this ship was killed by Tongan warriors. Mariner survived, and lived for four years on one of the islands before he was found by a passing English ship and was able to return to England.

In 1840, the US Exploring Expedition visited one of the islands and met with George (Taufa'ahau), the chief of Ha'apai.

Governors
 Havea Tu‘iha‘angana
 Moʻale Finau (appointed February 2015) 
 Tēvita Mohenoa Puloka (appointed 26 June 2018)
 Viliami Hingano (appointed 25 January 2021)
 Pita Faiva Taufatofua (appointed 28 December 2021)

See also
2006 Tonga earthquake
2022 Hunga Tonga–Hunga Ha'apai eruption and tsunami
List of islands and towns in Tonga

References

External links
 

 
Islands of Tonga
Divisions of Tonga